Neil Francis is a retired Irish rugby union lock forward and number eight. He played club rugby for Blackrock College, London Irish, Old Belvedere and provincially for Leinster. Francis also earned 36 caps for Ireland between 1987 and 1996 and competed in three rugby world cups in 1987, 1991 and 1995 respectively.

Controversy
On 16 February 2014, Francis sparked controversy when he said that "gay people do not have any interest in sport" and that "only a tiny percentage are actively involved in professional sports of any kind". The player-turned-pundit was speaking on Newstalk's Off the Ball and when asked by presenter Joe Molloy if he "believed the percentage of gay people involved in sport was lower than the 10 per cent which is the estimate of the general population who are gay", he said he suspected that the percentage was "nowhere near 10 per cent. I would say in the smaller margin of 1 per cent".

In November 2019, he suggested South Africa's win in the Rugby World Cup was "tainted by steroids".

On 23 July 2021, the Irish Independent newspaper terminated his contract, where he had been a columnist, following his remarks on one of their podcasts about British and Irish Lions player Marcus Smith. Francis described Smith, a half-Filipino, as having a "David Beckham haircut and an Oompa Loompa tan". Smith's club, Harlequin F.C., criticised the remarks as "offensive" and "racist". The Lions also criticised the remarks as "offensive". Francis apologised for any offence taken and for the fact that the comments were interpreted differently from what he intended.

References

Irish rugby union players
Ireland international rugby union players
Blackrock College RFC players
London Irish players
Leinster Rugby players
Old Belvedere R.F.C. players
Living people
People educated at Blackrock College
1964 births
Rugby union players from Dublin (city)
Irish rugby union commentators
Rugby union locks